Jac Constable (born 6 December 1997 in Fleet, Hampshire) is a British racing driver who currently competes in TCR UK and serves as a BTCC development driver, both for Power Maxed Racing. Constable made his British Touring Car Championship debut at Croft in 2020, however he withdrew after qualifying due to appendicitis.

Career

Karting
Born and raised in Fleet, Hampshire, Constable began karting in 2011 at the Trent Valley and the Shenington kart clubs, competing against drivers such as Formula 1 star Lando Norris, Formula 2 drivers Guanyu Zhou and Jack Aitken and 2 time W Series champion Jamie Chadwick. During his 5 year karting campaign, he would achieve respectable results such as 3rd place in the 2012 Kartmasters British Grand Prix, beating rival Lando Norris.

Ginetta GT5 Challenge
Jac would make his car racing debut in the 2016 Ginetta GT5 Challenge, competing with Xentek Motorsport. During this season he would finish 10th in the standings, with 2 podiums to his name.

Ginetta GT4 Supercup
In 2017 Constable would step up to the Ginetta GT4 Supercup, racing in the amateur class again with Xentek Motorsport. Picking up 13 in-class victories and 18 podiums, he would win the title, beating rival Colin White by 5 points.

For the following year, he would step up to the Pro class, finishing in 6th position overall with 2 podiums.

British Touring Car Championship
On 30 September 2020, it was announced that Constable would make his British Touring Car Championship debut at Croft, driving for Power Maxed Car Care Racing. After finishing in 21st out of 26 competitors in qualifying, Jac would withdraw prior to the races due to appendicitis.

He currently serves as a development driver for Power Maxed Racing.

TCR UK
Jac made his TCR UK debut in 2021, driving for Power Maxed Racing. He finished 6th in the standings, with 2 wins and 4 podiums. He continued in the championship in 2022.

Karting Record

Karting career summary

Racing record

Racing career summary 

* Season still in progress.

Complete Ginetta GT4 Supercup results
(key) (Races in bold indicate pole position) (Races in italics indicate fastest lap)

References

External links
 

British racing drivers
English racing drivers
People from Fleet, Hampshire
1997 births
Living people
British Touring Car Championship drivers
Ginetta GT4 Supercup drivers
Sportspeople from Hampshire
24H Series drivers